Daniel Boone May (1852 – unknown), known as Boone May, was an American gunfighter, of the Black Hills of South Dakota. 

May was born in Missouri. He was employed as a shotgun messenger by the Cheyenne and Black Hills Stage & Express Company during the late 1870s.

Reputedly the "fastest gun in the Dakotas", he had the reputation that "his corpses were invariably those of undesirable citizens, never of the law abiding."

External links
Boone May Page
May Tree Page
Boone May – Gunfighter? His reputation exceeded his accomplishments

1852 births
1878 deaths
American vigilantes
Gunslingers of the American Old West